Rhythm and Repose is the first solo studio album by Glen Hansard. The album was recorded by Patrick Dillett and produced by Thomas Bartlett. The song "Come Away to the Water" was covered by Maroon 5 and Rozzi Crane on the soundtrack for the 2012 film The Hunger Games. The album has sold 77,000 copies in the US as of September 2015.

Track listing

Personnel
Glen Hansard- songwriter, vocals, acoustic guitar, electric guitar (3), rhythm guitar (10), piano (6)
Thomas Bartlett- piano, keyboards, string arrangements, pump organ (9, 10), drums (1)
Brad Albetta- bass 
Rob Moose- strings, string arrangements
Ray Rizzo- drums (2, 4, 5, 7, 9, 10)
David Mansfield- slide guitar on "Maybe Not Tonight"
Bryan Devendorf- drums on "Talking with the Wolves"
Hannah Cohen- backing vocals on "Talking with the Wolves"
Javier Mas- Spanish guitar on "High Hope" and "Love, Don't Leave Me Waiting"
Jake Clemons- horns on "High Hope" and "Love, Don't Leave Me Waiting"
Clark Gayton- horns on "High Hope" and "Love, Don't Leave Me Waiting"
Curt Ramm- horns on "High Hope" and "Love, Don't Leave Me Waiting"
Sam Amidon- backing vocals on "High Hope" and "Races", banjo on "Races"
Cristin Milioti- backing vocals on "You Will Become" and "High Hope"
Nico Muhly- string arrangements on "The Storm, It's Coming"
Marketa Irglova- backing vocals on "You Will Become" and "What Are We Gonna Do"
Aida Shahghasemi- backing vocals on "You Will Become"
Joanna Christie- backing vocals on "This Gift"

Chart positions

References

2012 albums
Anti- (record label) albums
Glen Hansard albums